Sulbha Sanjay Khodke is an Indian politician from Maharashtra and a member of the Indian National Congress. She was elected as a member of the Legislative Assembly of Maharashtra from Amaravati.She was also the Vice-Chairman of the Vidarbha Irrigation Development Corporation Ltd. Priorly she was member of Legislative Assembly of Maharashtra from Badnera Constituency during 2004 to 2009. Besides she was Director and Chairman on various Govt. Institutions like Maharashtra State Consumer Federation, Mumbai, Maharashtra State Cooperative Banks Federation, Amravati District Central Cooperative Bank Ltd., Amravati Zilla Madhya varti Cooperative Bank Ltd., Shiddhivinay Bachatgat Mahasangh.

References

Indian National Congress politicians from Maharashtra
Living people
Women in Maharashtra politics
People from Amravati
Year of birth missing (living people)
Nationalist Congress Party politicians from Maharashtra